Ciarán Slevin (born 1986) is an Irish hurler who played as a centre-forward for the Offaly senior team.

Slevin has played for Offaly at levels, beginning as a member of the county minor and under-21 hurling teams. He joined the senior team during the 2007 National League and was included on the panel for the subsequent championship. He enjoyed little success during his one season on the senior team.

At club level Slevin is a one-time Leinster medalist with Kilcormac–Killoughey In addition to this he has also won one county club championship medal.

Playing career

Club

Slevin plays his club hurling with Kilcormac–Killoughey and has enjoyed some success.

After losing two county senior championship finals to Birr and Tullamore in the space of three years, Kilcormac-Killoughey lined out in a third championship decider in 2012. A 2-16 to 2-12 defeat of St. Rynagh's, with Slevin hitting 1-9, gave him an Offaly Senior Hurling Championship medal. He later added a Leinster medal to his collection following a 1-12 to 0-11 defeat of Oulart the Ballagh in the provincial decider.

Inter-county

Slevin first came to prominence on the inter-county scene as a member of the Offaly minor hurling team in 2004.  He enjoyed little success in this grade before joining the Offaly under-21 team in 2005. Once gain success eluded him in this grade.

Slevin joined the Offaly senior hurling team in 2007. He made his championship debut as a substitute in a Leinster quarter-final defeat of Laois that year. Slevin later came on as a substitute in an All-Ireland qualifier defeat of Dublin.

Career statistics

Club

Honours

Team
Kilcormac–Killoughey
 Leinster Senior Club Hurling Championship (1): 2012 (c)
 Offaly Senior Club Hurling Championship (1): 2012 (c)

References

1986 births
Living people
Kilcormac-Killoughey hurlers
Offaly inter-county hurlers